Ali Fethi Ben Mohamed Ben Brahim Riahi (Arabic:علي الرياحي), (March 30, 1912 Tunis – March 17, 1970), was a Tunisian singer and composer. He is the grandson of Sidi Brahim Riahi .

In 1938, Othman Kaak invited Riahi to join the radio, which was still in its infancy.

In 1950, the BBC devoted a complimentary program to him. The documents highlight, among other things, its decoration in 1954 by Muhammad VIII al-Amin of Nichan al Iftikhar (former Tunisian honorary order).

References 

20th-century Tunisian male singers
1912 births
1970 deaths
Musicians from Tunis
20th-century composers
Tunisian composers
Male composers